The 2019 Stratford-on-Avon District Council election took place on 2 May 2019 to elect members of the Stratford-on-Avon District Council in England. It was held on the same day as other local elections.

Summary

Election result

|-

Ward results

Alcester & Rural

Alcester Town

Avenue

Bidford East

Bidford West & Salford

Bishop Itchington

Bishopton

Brailes & Compton

Bridgetown

Clopton

Ettington

Guildhall

Harbury

Hathaway

Henley-in-Arden

Kineton

Kinwarton

Long Itchington & Stockton

Napton & Fenny Compton

Quinton

Red Horse

Shipston North

Shipston South

Shottery

Snitterfield

Southam North

Southam South

Studley with Mappleborough Green

Studley with Sambourne

Tanworth-in-Arden

Tiddington

Welcombe

Welford-on-Avon

Wellesbourne East

Wellsbourne West

Wootton Wawen

By-elections

Welford–on–Avon

References

2019 English local elections
May 2019 events in the United Kingdom
2019
2010s in Warwickshire